Vanessa Williams (born 1990) is a Sierra Leonean model and beauty pageant titleholder who was crowned as the winner of the 2012 edition of the Miss Sierra Leone pageant.

Early life and education
Born in a Freetown, Sierra Leone, Williams studied for a bachelor's degree at the University of Sierra Leone.

Pageantry

Miss Sierra Leone 2012
Whilst representing Western Area Urban District, Williams was crowned winner of the 2012 edition of Miss Sierra Leone that was held on 12 June at the Bintumani Conference Centre in Freetown. This result qualified her to represent her country at the Miss World 2012 pageant held on 18 August at Dongsheng Fitness Center Stadium in Ordos, Inner Mongolia, China.

Miss World 2019
She represented Sierra Leone at the Miss World 2012 pageant but failed to place.

External links
Vanessa Williams on Miss Sierra Leone 2012
 Miss World Official Profile

References

Sierra Leone Creole people
People of Sierra Leone Creole descent
1990 births
Living people
Miss World 2012 delegates
Sierra Leonean beauty pageant winners
People from Freetown